This is a list of notable restaurants in Hong Kong.

Restaurants 

  
  
  
  
 
  
  
 EL Cerdo (Central & Tsuen Wan)

Fast-food chains

See also

 List of Michelin starred restaurants in Hong Kong and Macau
 List of companies in Hong Kong
 List of restaurants
 Cuisine of Hong Kong

References

Further reading
 Hong Kong Earns Michelin Two-Star Boost - Scene Asia - WSJ

External links

 Where Are the World’s Best Restaurants? A Look at the Changing Landscape of Michelin’s Gold-Star Winners - The Daily Beast

Restaurants
Lists of companies of Hong Kong
Hong Kong